South Norwood is a ward in the London Borough of Croydon in the United Kingdom. It covers most of the district of South Norwood. The ward received major boundary changes following Croydon's boundary review. The first election held under the new boundaries was the 2018 Croydon Council election. The most recent election was the 2022 Croydon London Borough Council election, where 2 new councillors were elected.

History

2021 by-elections 
On 6 May 2021, 5 by-elections were held in Croydon following the resignation of 5 councillors across New Addington North, South Norwood, Kenley, Park Hill and Whitgift and Woodside.

Regina Road 
On 22 March 2021, ITV News released an article documenting the poor conditions of Regina Road flats showing images of the "appalling and dangerous conditions" caused by a water leak that had been present since at least 2017. An independent investigation was put forward to resolve the problems.

List of Councillors

Mayoral election results 
Below are the results for the candidate which received the highest share of the popular vote in the ward at each mayoral election.

Ward Results

References

Wards of the London Borough of Croydon